Hotchkiss is a statutory town in Delta County, Colorado, United States. The population was 944 at the 2010 census.

A post office called Hotchkiss has been in operation since 1882. The town is named after Enos T. Hotchkiss, a local pioneer.

Geography
Hotchkiss is located in eastern Delta County at  (38.799275, -107.716976), on the north side of the North Fork Gunnison River.

Colorado State Highway 92 passes through the center of town as Bridge Street, leading west  to Delta, the county seat, and southeast  to U.S. Route 50 at Blue Mesa Reservoir. Colorado State Highway 133 starts at the east end of town and leads northeast  over McClure Pass to Carbondale.

Demographics

As of the census of 2000, there were 968 people, 412 households, and 271 families residing in the town. The racial makeup of the town was 93.18% White, 1.03% Native American, 0.52% Asian, 3.51% from other races, and 1.76% from two or more races. Hispanic or Latino of any race were 9.40% of the population.

There were 412 households, out of which 31.6% had children under the age of 18 living with them, 51.7% were married couples living together, 9.7% had a female householder with no husband present, and 34.2% were non-families. 30.3% of all households were made up of individuals, and 14.6% had someone living alone who was 65 years of age or older.  The average household size was 2.34 and the average family size was 2.91.

In the town, the population was spread out, with 25.6% under the age of 18, 9.6% from 18 to 24, 26.4% from 25 to 44, 22.0% from 45 to 64, and 16.3% who were 65 years of age or older.  The median age was 39 years. For every 100 females, there were 88.0 males.  For every 100 females age 18 and over, there were 87.0 males.

The median income for a household in the town was $28,056, and the median income for a family was $31,989. Males had a median income of $31,635 versus $20,469 for females. The per capita income for the town was $13,218.  About 11.0% of families and 14.3% of the population were below the poverty line, including 16.5% of those under age 18 and 11.9% of those age 65 or over.

Schools 
The Delta County School District Board of Education decided in February 2021 to close separate high schools in Hotchkiss and Paonia, Colorado and build a joint high school, North Fork High School, located in Hotchkiss. Both schools have been losing students as coal mines in the area have closed. Kindergarten to 8th grade education will continue in both communities.

See also

Outline of Colorado
Index of Colorado-related articles
State of Colorado
Colorado cities and towns
Colorado municipalities
Colorado counties
Delta County, Colorado

References

External links

Town of Hotchkiss official website
The Delta County Independent, local community weekly covering Hotchkiss and the rest of Delta County
CDOT map of the Town of Hotchkiss

Towns in Delta County, Colorado
Towns in Colorado